Anastasia A. Pittman (born July 19, 1970) is an American politician from the state of Oklahoma. She represented the 99th district in the Oklahoma House of Representatives, as a member of the Democratic Party. Pittman served in the House from 2006 to 2013. On April 11, 2014, she filed to run for an Oklahoma Senate seat vacated by Constance N. Johnson. Pittman was elected to the Oklahoma Senate and represents the 48th district. In 2018, she was the Democratic Party nominee for lieutenant governor in Oklahoma.

Early life
Pittman was born on July 19, 1970, in Miami, Florida. Her family moved back and forth from Miami to Oklahoma City every summer. During one summer, Pittman's parents did not return on time for her and her brother and their grandmother enrolled them in school in Oklahoma. Pittman's grandmother later became her legal guardian and Pittman finished high school and college in Oklahoma. Pittman graduated from Star Spencer High School.

Education
She earned a Bachelor of Arts degree in journalism and public relations in 1999 from the University of Oklahoma and a Master's degree in Education and Behavioral Science from Langston University in 2002.

Political career

House of Representatives
She was first elected to the Oklahoma House of Representatives in 2006. In 2013 Pittman was selected to lead the Legislative Black Caucus of the Oklahoma Legislature.

Committees
Banking subcommittee
Economic Development and Financial Services
Aerospace and Technology subcommittee on Energy and Technology
Human Services Committee
Elderly and Long-term Care subcommittee
Health subcommittee on Public Health

Oklahoma Senate
Pittman was elected to the Oklahoma Senate in 2014.

Committees
Appropriations
Appropriations Subcommittee on Health and Human Services
Appropriations Subcommittee on Select Agencies
Business and Commerce
General Government
Health and Human Services
Transportation
Veterans and Military Affairs

Achievements and awards
Pittman has received numerous awards for her work and achievements.
Outstanding Community Service Recognition from Bill Clinton for the Magic Star Foundation
Cooperative Extension-Outreach Service and Leadership Award from Langston University
Unity in the Community State Award from Oklahoma Federal Executive Board
Outstanding Leadership Award from Chief E. Kelly Haney honoring Seminole women
Lecia Swain/Theodis Payne Media Award from NAACP
Media Advocacy Award from the Oklahoma Coalition Against Domestic Violence and Sexual Assault
Oklahoma Achiever’s Award from Metropolitan Better Living Center.

Pittman also hosts her own radio show, "The Anastasia Pittman Show"

Electoral history

References

External links
 
Women of the Oklahoma Legislature Oral History Project -- OSU Library

|-

|-

1970 births
21st-century American politicians
21st-century American women politicians
African-American state legislators in Oklahoma
African-American women in politics
Langston University alumni
Living people
Democratic Party members of the Oklahoma House of Representatives
Democratic Party Oklahoma state senators
Politicians from Miami
Politicians from Oklahoma City
University of Oklahoma alumni
Candidates in the 2018 United States elections
21st-century African-American women
21st-century African-American politicians
20th-century African-American people
20th-century African-American women
Seminole Nation of Oklahoma state legislators in Oklahoma